Éric Guyot (born 10 March 1962) is a French former professional racing cyclist. He rode in one edition of the Tour de France and four editions of the Vuelta a España.

References

External links

1962 births
Living people
French male cyclists
Sportspeople from Belfort
Cyclists from Bourgogne-Franche-Comté